Steven James Arentz (born April 17, 1951, in Hollywood, California) is an American politician. He is a Republican and is a member of the Maryland House of Delegates representing district 36, based in Caroline, Carroll, Kent, and Queen Anne's Counties, Maryland.

Personal life and career
Arentz was born in Hollywood, California. He attended the Community College of Allegheny County and the Control Data Institute in Pittsburgh, Pennsylvania, and Newbury Junior College in Brookline, Massachusetts. He previously owned Hemingway's Restaurant in Stevensville, Maryland until its closure in October 2010. He has been a realtor for Long & Foster since 2003.

In 2010, Arentz was elected to the Queen Anne's County Board of County Commissioners and served as chair of the Roads Board and Sanitary Commission until November 19, 2013. At the same time, he served as a member on the Queen Anne's County Board of Health and on the Task Force on Government Sustainability.

Arentz is married to his wife, Biana, and has two children, Elizabeth and Steven, Jr.

In the legislature
Arentz was appointed to the Maryland House of Delegates on November 12, 2013, by Governor Martin O'Malley, filling a vacancy left by former delegate Stephen S. Hershey Jr. after he was appointed to the Senate to serve out the term of former Senate Minority Leader E. J. Pipkin. He was sworn in on November 19, 2013. From 2017 to 2020, Arnetz served as the Deputy Minority Whip for the Maryland House Republican Caucus, and has served as the chair of the Queen Anne's County Delegation and the Eastern Shore Delegation since 2015 and 2019, respectively.

Arentz has served on the following committees:
 Economic Matters Committee, 2015–present (consumer protection & commercial law subcommittee, 2015–2019; alcoholic beverages subcommittee, 2015–present; workers compensation subcommittee, 2015–present; property & casualty insurance subcommittee, 2019–present; unemployment insurance subcommittee, 2019–present)
 Joint Audit and Evaluation Committee, 2019–present
 Joint Audit Committee, 2015–2019
 Appropriations Committee, 2014–2015

Electoral history

References

Republican Party members of the Maryland House of Delegates
Living people
1951 births
People from Hollywood, Los Angeles
Politicians from Los Angeles
21st-century American politicians
County commissioners in Maryland